Helena Brodin (born 6 August 1970) is a Swedish sailor. She competed in the Europe event at the 1992 Summer Olympics.

References

External links
 
 
 

1970 births
Living people
Swedish female sailors (sport)
Olympic sailors of Sweden
Sailors at the 1992 Summer Olympics – Europe
Sportspeople from Gothenburg